The Colombian Open 2013 was the men's edition of the 2013 Colombian Open, which was a tournament of the PSA World Tour event International (Prize money : 50 000 $). The event took place in Bogota in Colombia from 8 to 11 August. Peter Barker won his fourth Colombian Open trophy, beating Omar Mosaad in the final.

Prize money and ranking points
For 2013, the prize purse was $50,000. The prize money and points breakdown is as follows:

Seeds

Draw and results

See also
PSA World Tour 2013
Colombian Open

References

External links
PSA Colombian Open 2013 website
Abierto Colombiano De Squash 2013 official website

Colombian Open (squash)
Colombian Open
2013 in Colombian sport